(stylized as rkb) is a broadcasting station in Fukuoka, Japan, and it is affiliated with Japan Radio Network (JRN), Japan News Network (JNN) and TBS Network. It is owned by Mainichi Broadcasting System, Mainichi Shimbun and the Aso Group.

Station

Radio
Fukuoka: 1278 kHz JOFR 50 kW; 91.0 MHz FM
Kitakyushu: 1197 kHz JOFO 1 kW; 91.5 MHz FM
Omuta: 1062 kHz JOFE 100W; 94.8 MHz FM
Yukuhashi: 1062 kHz 100W; 94.6 MHz FM

TV (Analog)
Fukuoka: Channel 4 JOFR-TV
Kitakyushu :Channel 8 JOFO-TV
Kurume: Channel 48
Omuta: Channel 61
Yukuhashi: Channel 60

TV (Digital)
Button 4
Fukuoka: Channel 30 JOFR-DTV

Program

Anime 
Bocchi the Rock!
The Idolmaster

TV 
Kyokan TV(13:55 - 15:50 every Monday To Friday)
Kyokan News
Watch@24
Sunday Watch
Tadaima!
TEEN!TEEN!
Mame Gohan。
P Paradise  (about Pachinko).

Other TV stations in Fukuoka
 NHK Fukuoka and Kitakyushu
 Kyushu Asahi Broadcasting (KBC, affiliated with TV Asahi and ANN) - 1
 Fukuoka Broadcasting Corporation (FBS, affiliated with NTV and NNN / NNS) - 5
TVQ Kyushu Broadcasting (TVQ, affiliated with TV Tokyo and TX Network) - 7
 Television Nishinippon Corporation (TNC, affiliated with CX and FNN / FNS) - 8

References

Japan News Network
Television stations in Japan
Radio in Japan
Radio stations established in 1951
Television channels and stations established in 1958
Mass media in Fukuoka
1951 establishments in Japan